Thomas Nicholas (c. 1575 – 13/14 August 1638) was an English politician who sat in the House of Commons from 1621 to 1622.

Nicholas was the eldest son of Reginald Nicholas of Prestbury, Gloucestershire. He was educated in the law at the New Inn and the Middle Temple (1594). 

In 1621, he was elected Member of Parliament for Cirencester. He was a J.P. for Gloucestershire and was appointed High Sheriff of Gloucestershire for 1626–27.

Nicholas married twice: firstly Jane, daughter of John Audley and widow of Andrew Ketelby of Gloucestershire; and secondly Bridget, the daughter of Michael Strange of Cirencester, Gloucestershire and Somerford Keynes, Wiltshire. He had no children and was buried at Stratton.

References

 

1638 deaths
Place of birth missing
People from Cirencester
English MPs 1621–1622
High Sheriffs of Gloucestershire
Politicians from Gloucestershire
Year of birth uncertain